Railway stations in Iraq include:

Towns served

Existing 
 Baghdad Central Station
 Al Maqal Railway Station in Basra

 Bayji
 Al Hadithah – junction
 Al Qaim
 Akashat – railhead in west

Under construction 
 Khanaqin-Khosravi, (Under construction)

Proposed 
 Arbil – NE –
 Baghdad – C –
 Umm Qasr – S –

Maps 
 UNHCR Atlas Map
 UN Map
 Official website
 On Track on line – web log showing some recent photos
 Andrew's Locomotive and Rolling Stock in Iraq Page—excellent website with comprehensive roster of IRR locomotives; occasionally updated with news from Iraq.
 Iraq Railway Network Detailed map of railway routes in Iraq by the United Nations Joint Logistics Centre
 Rainer's Pages are dedicated to the old Railway Postal System of Iraq. It also shows old Iraq Railway Maps, Postal Cards and Photos.

See also 
 Transport in Iraq
 Railway stations in Jordan

References

External links

Railway stations
Iraq
Railway stations